Quality Bicycle Products (QBP) is a large distributor of bicycle parts and accessories in the bicycle industry, with revenues of $150 million in 2008.  In addition to wholesaling bicycles and components from other manufacturers, QBP owns and manufactures several brands of its own. QBP also participates in activities which support its community through cycling advocacy and green building.

History
Founded by Steve Flagg and Mary Henrickson in 1981, QBP operated from a small office in St. Paul, MN. The company did $100,000 in sales during its first year. In the second year sales reached $250,000 and in 1983 the company received half a million dollars in sales. Early on, the company's main product was its mountain bikes, and QBP also specialised in importing hard-to-find mountain-bike parts from suppliers in Japan. In 1984 QBP hired its first employee and sold $1 million in parts. In 1996 QBP purchased a  warehouse on its current site in West Bloomington.

QBP purchased Salsa Cycles in 1997, a California-based mountain-bike manufacturer. The following year, the firm entered the emerging single-speed bike market with its in-house designed Singleton chain tensioner. Later in 1998, this product and the new Rat Ride single-speed frame (soon renamed the 1X1) helped launch the company’s new start-up, Surly Bikes. The company continued developing brands for under-served markets, adding specialty parts with Problem Solvers, value parts and accessories with Dimension, and high-end components with Winwood.  It also became the exclusive U.S. distributor for Jagwire, a Taiwan-based manufacturer of bicycle brake and derailleur components including pads, cables and cable housing.

Responding to the growing trend of bike commuting and “transportation-oriented” cycling, the firm created the Civia bike brand in 2007. The following year, it firm transformed Wheelhouse, its dealer-oriented wheel-building service, into Handspun, a consumer-oriented manufacturer of hand-trued and custom-built wheels. It also founded All-City, which offers single-speed and fixed-gear bikes, parts and accessories for urban bicycling. In 2007 QBP received the first annual Carbon Buster Award from U.S. Senator Amy Klobuchar.  The firm  opened a second distribution center in Ogden, Utah in the spring of 2010 that has  been awarded LEED Gold certification by the U.S. Green Building Council,   the firm was named one of America's Top Work Places by Outside Magazine in 2011. Later that year the firm opened a third distribution center in Middletown, PA, and  moved to new facility in Lancaster, PA in January 2015.

In 2015 Flagg retired from his position as CEO and was replaced with Rich Tauer, previously vice-president of marketing and sales. Flagg continued on as the company's chairman. That year the company opened offices in Taiwan, bringing the company to 690 employees. In 2016 the company opened a fourth facility in Reno, Nevada.

In April 2020, the company announced layoffs for 12 percent of its workforce due to the COVID-19 pandemic.

Brands
The company owns nineteen brands including Salsa, Surly, All-City, 45North, Handspun, Foundry, Civia, Whisky, MSW, Problem Solvers, Dimension, Mechanical Threads, R12, Q-Tubes, Buzzy's and iSSi. Through its Q-Active division, the company distributes products to independent ski, run and outdoor retailers. QBP entered a distribution agreement with Fyxation in 2011. The company distributes both bicycles themselves and bicycle parts, in addition to outdoor gear.

References

Cycle manufacturers of the United States
Wholesalers of the United States
Manufacturing companies based in Minnesota
Companies based in Bloomington, Minnesota
American companies established in 1981
Manufacturing companies established in 1981
Leadership in Energy and Environmental Design gold certified buildings